Bethune-Powell Buildings are two historic commercial buildings located at Clinton, Sampson County, North Carolina.  They were built in 1902, and are two-story, brick buildings with decorative pressed metal sheathing and brick cornices on the front facade.  The Bethune Building is six bays wide and the Powell Building three bays wide.  The pressed metal sheathing features a robust pattern of colonnaded, arched garland friezes, and modillion cornice. The buildings were constructed following a fire that destroyed much of the Clinton commercial district.

It was added to the National Register of Historic Places in 1986.  They are located in the Clinton Commercial Historic District.

References

Commercial buildings on the National Register of Historic Places in North Carolina
Commercial buildings completed in 1902
Buildings and structures in Sampson County, North Carolina
National Register of Historic Places in Sampson County, North Carolina
Individually listed contributing properties to historic districts on the National Register in North Carolina